Veeam Backup & Replication is a proprietary backup app developed by Veeam for virtual environments built on VMware vSphere, Nutanix AHV, and Microsoft Hyper-V hypervisors. The software provides backup, restore and replication functionality for virtual machines, physical servers and workstations as well as cloud-based workload.

Operation
Veeam Backup & Replication operates both the virtualization layer as well manages physical machine backup. It backs up VMs at the image-level using a hypervisor's snapshots to retrieve VM data. Backups can be full (a full copy of VM image) or incremental (saving only the changed blocks of data since the last backup job run). Backup increments are created using the built-in changed block tracking (CBT) mechanism. The available backup methods include forward incremental-forever backup, forward incremental backup, and reverse incremental backup. Additionally, there is an option to perform active full and synthetic full backups.
Veeam Backup & Replication provides automated recovery verification for both backups and replicas. The program starts a VM directly from a backup or replica in the isolated test environment and runs tests against it. During the verification, the VM image remains in a read-only state. This mechanism can also be used for troubleshooting or testing patches and upgrades.

Backup storage
Veeam Backup & Replication supports software-defined storage technology. It allows organizing a scalable backup repository from a collection of heterogeneous storage devices. Backups can be stored on-premises, transferred to off-site repositories via the WAN, saved to tape media for long-term retention, or sent to cloud storage. Cloud storage support is available on an Infrastructure-as-a-Service (IaaS) model. Veeam's technology, Cloud Connect, provides integrated and secured backup to the cloud through Veeam-powered service providers.
Veeam Backup & Replication is storage-agnostic, but it also has specialized storage integrations with some storage systems such as Cisco HyperFlex, EMC VNX, EMC VNXe, HP 3PAR, HP StoreVirtual, Nimble, NetApp, IBM, Lenovo Storage V Series. In addition, through a separate Universal Storage API and plug-in, Veeam also provides storage integrations with INFINIDAT  and Pure Storage. It uses storage system snapshots as a source for backups and recovery of VMware VMs with disks residing on storage volumes. Veeam Backup & Replication also have build in direct NFS agent which allows to access NetApp snapshots directly from NAS storage bypassing hosts for backup, restore & storage scan operations.

Replication
Along with backup, Veeam Backup & Replication can perform image-based VM replication. It creates a "clone" of a production VM onsite or offsite and keeps it in a ready-to-use state. Each VM replica has a configurable number of failover points. Image-based VM replication is also available via Veeam Cloud Connect for Disaster Recovery as a Service (DRaaS).

Recovery
The software provides a number of data recovery options, including: 
Entire VM recovery:
 An immediate restore of a VM via mounting a VM image to a host directly from a backup file (Instant VM Recovery)
 Full extraction of a VM image from a backup
File-level recovery:
 Restore specific VM files such as virtual disks, configuration files, etc.
 VM guest OS files restore from a number of different file systems including Linux, BSD macOS, Novell NetWare and Solaris
Virtual drive restore:
 A specific VM hard drive recovery
Application-item recovery:
 Granular recovery of items from Microsoft Exchange Server, Microsoft SharePoint, Microsoft Active Directory, Microsoft SQL Server and Oracle Databases, as well as recovery of single files and VMs from storage snapshots for existing storage partners.

Optimization
Veeam Backup & Replication decreases backup files size and data traffic with built-in data deduplication and compression. There is support for deduplicating storage systems such as EMC Data Domain, ExaGrid and HP StoreOnce Catalyst and NetApp Cloud Backup (AltaVault). Using deduplicating storage appliances as backup repositories allows achieving greater levels of deduplication ratios. Veeam Backup & Replication also provides built-in WAN acceleration to reduce the bandwidth required for transferring backups and replicas over the WAN.

Architecture
Built on a modular scheme, Veeam Backup & Replication allows for setting scalable backup infrastructures. The software architecture supports onsite, offsite and cloud-base data protection, operations across remote sites and geographically dispersed locations. The installation package of Veeam Backup & Replication includes a set of mandatory and optional components that can be installed on physical or virtual machines.

Mandatory components 
 Veeam backup server – a Windows-based physical or virtual machine where Veeam Backup & Replication is installed. It is the core component responsible for all types of administrative activities in a backup infrastructure, including general orchestration of backup, restore and replication tasks, job scheduling and resource allocation.
 Backup proxy – an appliance that retrieves backup data from the source host and transfers it to the backup repository offloading the Veeam backup server.
 Backup repository – a primary storage for backup files, VM copies, and meta-data.

Optional components
 Backup Enterprise Manager – a centralized management web browser interface intended for distributed enterprise environments with multiple backup servers.
 Veeam Backup Search – an add-on to Microsoft Search Server for search performance optimization.
 Standalone Console — a lightweight console for installation on laptops and desktops to enable the management of the backup server remotely over the network and eliminate RDP sessions to a backup server.
 Scale-Out Backup Repository — Since version 9 it's possible to build a flat backup repository space from a number of independent and non-clustered sources. This feature eliminates any need in a clustered backup namespace, now Veeam users to store older backups in more affordable storage targets.

Editions
Veeam Backup & Replication is positioned as a part of the Veeam Availability Suite bundle (which includes Veeam ONE for monitoring, reporting, and capacity planning), but can also be installed as a standalone product. It is available in three editions based on the level of provided functionality. The product is licensed by the number of CPU sockets, or through annually or upfront-billed subscription licenses on a per-VM basis. As of Veeam Backup & Replication 9.5 Update 4 (U4), Veeam is now using Veeam Instance Licensing (VIL) to lower complexity of license key management. Essentially, VIL allows for a single license key, or instance, to be deployed on most Veeam products - from Backup & Replication server to Veeam ONE to Windows and Linux agents. The number of instance keys consumed per machine will vary by license edition (standard, enterprise, or enterprise plus) and the software you are enabling.

History

References

External links
Veeam Backup & Replication 10 Release Notes

Backup software
Proprietary cross-platform software